Anna Folkema (22 May 1695 – 8 October 1768), was an 18th-century engraver from the Northern Netherlands.

Biography 

Folkema was born in Dokkum as the daughter of Johann Jakob Folkema, a goldsmith. She was the sister of Jacob Folkema. Their father moved the family to Amsterdam, where they ran a family business of making prints.

She died in Amsterdam.

Selected works 

 Two children drinking out of a bowl. Folkema Anna 1748. Line.
 Two children and a cat lying on a grassy bank. Folkema Anna 1748. Line.

References

External links 

 
 Anna Folkema on 1001 Vrouwen uit de Nederlandse geschiedenis

1695 births
1768 deaths
18th-century Dutch women artists
Engravers from Amsterdam
People from Dokkum
Women engravers